I. M. (Ivan Murray) Johnston (February 28, 1898–May 31, 1960), was a United States botanist. He studied at Pomona College in Claremont, California and at Harvard University. His plant collections are housed in the Rancho Santa Ana Botanic Garden, in Claremont, and also in the Gray Herbarium of Harvard University.

His areas of interest, were, among others: Pteridophytes, Spermatophytes

Honours
In 1925, German botanist August Brand, named a genus of flowering plants (belonging to the family Boraginaceae), from South America and southern states in USA, as Johnstonella in his honour. Then in 1933, botanist O.E.Schulz named a genus of flowering plants (belonging to the family Brassicaceae), from Chile as Ivania. In 1936, botanist Hsen Hsu Hu  published Sinojohnstonia, which is a genus of flowering plants from China, belonging to the family Boraginaceae. Lastly in 1975, another botanist Kazmi, named a monotypic genus of flowering plants (belonging to the family Boraginaceae), from the Western Himalaya region, Ivanjohnstonia also named in his honour.

Taxa named by Johnston 
 Fitzroya cupressoides
 Leucophyllum frutescens
 Astragalus sprucei
 Euplassa
 Euplassa occidentalis
 Fuchsia hypoleuca
 Brunnera macrophylla

References

Literature 
 R.E.G.Pichi Sermolli, 1 March 1991
 James S Miller, Mary Sue Taylor und Erin Rempala: Ivan M. Johnston's Studies in the Boraginaceae. Missouri BG, 2005. 
 Donovan S. Correll: Ivan Murray Johnston (1898–1960). In: Taxon, Vol. 10, Nr. 1 (Jan., 1961), Seiten 1-8
 J. Lanjouw: Ivan Murray Johnston (1898–1960). In: Taxon, Vol. 9, Nr. 7 (Sep., 1960), Seite 220
 Robert Jan 'Roy' van de Hoek: Restoration and Recovery for Elna Bakker and Ivan Johnston. "R&R" for the Playa del Rey Frogs and Plants. 2005

Pteridologists
Botanists active in California
1898 births
1960 deaths
Harvard University alumni
Pomona College alumni
Scientists from California
20th-century American botanists